Classic Yes is the second compilation album by the English progressive rock band Yes, released in November 1981 by Atlantic Records. It was released after the group had disbanded in early 1981, following their 1980 tour in support of their tenth studio album, Drama (1980). The tracks were compiled by bassist Chris Squire and the cover was designed by Roger Dean.

Upon its release, it charted at No. 142 on the US Billboard 200. Some pressings included a free single of previously unreleased live versions of "Roundabout" and "I've Seen All Good People". The album became a strong seller, and was certified platinum by the Recording Industry Association of America (RIAA) for selling over one million copies.

Track listing

Personnel
Yes
 Jon Anderson – lead vocals
 Steve Howe – guitars, vocals
 Chris Squire – bass guitar, vocals
 Tony Kaye – keyboards on "Yours Is No Disgrace" and "Starship Trooper"
 Rick Wakeman – keyboards on everything else
 Alan White – drums on "Wonderous Stories", "Roundabout", and "I've Seen All Good People"
 Bill Bruford – drums on everything else

Production
 Chris Squire – album compilation
 Yes – production
 Eddy Offord – production, engineer

Charts

Certifications

References

Albums with cover art by Roger Dean (artist)
1981 greatest hits albums
Albums produced by Eddy Offord
Yes (band) compilation albums
Atlantic Records compilation albums